Raj Bhavan (translation: Government House) is the official residence of the governor of Gujarat. It is located in the capital city of Gandhinagar, Gujarat. The present governor of Gujarat is Shri Acharya Dev Vrat

Yatkinchit is the in-house magazine of Raj Bhavan.

See also
  Government Houses of the British Indian Empire

References

External links
 The official web site of Governor of Gujarat

Governors' houses in India
Government of Gujarat
Buildings and structures in Gandhinagar